Kailuka is a village in Saaremaa Parish, Saare County, on the island of Saaremaa, Estonia. In 2011 there were 64 inhabitants, including 34 men and 30 women. Of these, 62 were Estonians. In 2000 the population was 75, including 35 men and 40 women. There were 74 permanent residents. Of these, 73 were Estonians.

Before the administrative reform in 2017, the village was in Pihtla Parish.

References 

Villages in Saare County